The University of Texas at Austin is home to more than 65 national fraternity and sorority chapters. These chapters are under the authority of one of UT Austin's seven Greek council communities, Interfraternity Council, National Pan-Hellenic Council, Latino Pan-Hellenic Council, Texas Asian Pan-Hellenic Council, Multicultural Greek Council, United Greek Council and University Panhellenic Council. Other recognized Fraternities and Sororites exist as Affiliates.  Affiliate Membership targets two groups: fraternities and sororities that fit into a current council structure and are waiting until they can petition a council, as well as fraternities and sororities that do not fit into a current structure but still want to be a part of Sorority and Fraternity Life.

Interfraternity Council
Alpha Epsilon Pi
Beta Theta Pi
Beta Upsilon Chi
Delta Kappa Epsilon
Delta Sigma Phi
Delta Tau Delta
Delta Upsilon
Kappa Alpha Order
Kappa Sigma
Lambda Chi Alpha
Phi Delta Theta
Phi Gamma Delta
Phi Kappa Psi
Phi Kappa Sigma
Phi Kappa Tau
Phi Kappa Theta
Pi Kappa Alpha
Pi Kappa Phi
Sigma Alpha Mu
Sigma Chi
Sigma Phi Epsilon
Sigma Pi
Tau Kappa Epsilon
Theta Chi
Zeta Beta Tau
Zeta Psi

National Pan-Hellenic Council
Alpha Kappa Alpha
Alpha Phi Alpha
Delta Sigma Theta
Kappa Alpha Psi
Omega Psi Phi
Phi Beta Sigma
Sigma Gamma Rho
Zeta Phi Beta

Latino Pan-Hellenic Council
Sigma Lambda Beta
Omega Delta Phi
Kappa Delta Chi
Lambda Theta Alpha
Lambda Theta Phi
Sigma Delta Lambda
Sigma Lambda Gamma
Phi Iota Alpha

Texas Asian Pan-Hellenic Council
alpha Kappa Delta Phi
Beta Kappa Gamma
Omega Phi Gamma
Gamma Beta
Kappa Phi Gamma
Kappa Phi Lambda
Sigma Phi Omega
Delta Kappa Delta
Alpha Sigma Rho

Multicultural Greek Council
Delta Alpha Omega
Sigma Kappa Phi
Delta Alpha Sigma

University Panhellenic Council
Alpha Chi Omega (Alpha Phi, 1924)
Alpha Delta Pi (Delta, 1906; oldest continuously active Alpha Delta Pi chapter)
Alpha Epsilon Phi (Omega, 1925)
Alpha Phi (Omega, 1920)
Alpha Xi Delta (Beta Alpha, 1929)
Chi Omega (Iota, 1904)
Delta Delta Delta (Theta Zeta, 1912)
Delta Gamma (Beta Eta, 1939)
Kappa Alpha Theta (Alpha Theta, 1904)
Kappa Delta (Sigma Epsilon, 1921)
Kappa Kappa Gamma (Beta Xi, 1902)
Pi Beta Phi (Texas Alpha, 1902)
Sigma Delta Tau (Tau, 1939)
Zeta Tau Alpha (Kappa, 1906)

National Interfraternity Music Council
Kappa Kappa Psi (Alpha Tau, 1940)
Mu Phi Epsilon (Mu Theta, 1920)
Phi Mu Alpha Sinfonia (Alpha Iota, 1924)
Sigma Alpha Iota (Beta Xi, 1951)
Tau Beta Sigma (Beta Gamma, 1957)

Affiliates
Alpha Sigma Phi
Beta Chi Theta
Chi Upsilon Sigma
Delta Lambda Phi
Sigma Iota Alpha
Omega Phi Gamma
Gamma Rho Lambda
Sigma Lambda Alpha
Lambda Phi Epsilon
Lambda Upsilon Lambda (Interest Group)

References

External links
 Greek Life and Intercultural Education Greek Life and Intercultural Education

University of Texas at Austin
Texas, University of (Austin)
fraternities and sororities at University of Texas at Austin